The Armstrong Whitworth Atlas was a British single-engine biplane designed and built by Armstrong Whitworth Aircraft. It served as an army co-operation aircraft for the Royal Air Force (RAF) in the 1920s and 1930s. It was the first purpose-designed aircraft of the army co-operation type to serve with the RAF.

Development
The Armstrong Whitworth Atlas was designed by a team led by John Lloyd, chief designer of Armstrong Whitworth Aircraft, as a replacement for the DH.9A and Bristol Fighter as an army co-operation aircraft for the RAF, in parallel with the related aircraft, the Ajax and Aries. The Atlas was intended to meet the requirements of Specification 20/25.

The prototype Atlas (G-EBLK) was built as a private venture, first flying on 10 May 1925. It was delivered to the Aeroplane and Armament Experimental Establishment (A & AEE), Martlesham Heath, where it was evaluated against the Bristol Boarhound, de Havilland Hyena, Vickers Vespa, and Short Chamois. It proved superior in performance and handling and was recommended for production.

While the performance was generally good, the prototype could not be sideslipped steeply, and this resulted in a redesign where sweptback metal wings, with differing wing section, were fitted. When tested again, the Atlas was found to have lost its good handling, having dangerous stall characteristics. The Atlas had already been ordered for service, however, and suffered a number of accidents during takeoff and landing in the first few months of operation until modified with automatic slats and increased sweepback. This cured the poor handling. The production Atlas had a steel tube fuselage with fabric covering with single-bay swept metal wings. It could be fitted with a hook under the fuselage to pick up messages and could carry a 460 lb (210 kg) bombload under the wings.

Operational history

The first batch of 37 aircraft were ordered in 1927, entering service with 13 Squadron RAF and 26 Squadron in that year. Once the initial handling problems had been solved by the fitting of slats, the Atlas proved well suited for army co-operation, in use at home and overseas, with 208 squadron, being the first squadron to operate Atlases outside Britain, replacing Bristol fighters at Heliopolis, Egypt in 1930. Atlases were also used for communications duties and as advanced trainers, with 175 dual-control models built. The Atlas continued in service in the army co-operations role until replaced with the Hawker Audax, a variant of the Hawker Hart, with the last operational squadron, 208, re-equipping in 1935. It was also replaced in the advanced trainer role in 1935 by the Hawker Hart Trainer. Four civil registered Atlas trainers were used by Air Service Training Ltd for advanced and reserve flying training. They were scrapped in 1938.

Variants

 Atlas I Army co-operation aircraft - 271 built for the RAF.
 Atlas Trainer Dual-control trainer version of Atlas I - 175 built.
 Atlas II Cleaned up, more powerful version, powered by  Armstrong Siddeley Panther. Rejected in favour of Audax by RAF. 15 built for Kwangsi Air Force, China.
 Ajax minor differences from Atlas I - 4 built for RAF.
 Aries improved Atlas I with easier access for maintenance and increased dimensions - one built
 EAF Atlas Greek lower-cost version (main differences in wing structure, engine and propeller) - 10 built by EAF (KEA) after 1931.

Operators

Military

 Royal Canadian Air Force
 No. 2 Squadron RCAF
 No. 111 Squadron RCAF
 No. 118 Squadron RCAF

 Kwangsi Air Force

 Chinese Nationalist Air Force

 Hellenic Air Force
 Hellenic Navy

 Royal Air Force
 No. 2 Squadron RAF
 No. 4 Squadron RAF
 No 13 Squadron RAF
 No. 16 Squadron RAF
 No. 26 Squadron RAF
 No. 208 Squadron RAF
 No. 1 Flying Training School RAF
 No. 3 Flying Training School RAF
 No. 4 Flying Training School RAF
 No. 5 Flying Training School RAF
 RAF College Cranwell

Civil

 Air Service Training Ltd.

Specifications (Atlas I)

See also

References

Citations

Bibliography

External links

 RCAF.com - Canadian Atlases

1920s British bomber aircraft
Atlas
Biplanes
Single-engined tractor aircraft
Aircraft first flown in 1925